The Wayfarer's Walk is a 71 mile long distance footpath in England from Walbury Hill, Berkshire to Emsworth, Hampshire.

The north-west end is at the car park on top of Walbury Hill, near to the landmark Combe Gibbet, and the south-east end is Emsworth town square.

The footpath approximates an ancient route that might have been used by drovers taking cattle for export.  It passes through the towns of New Alresford, Droxford, Hambledon, Havant and Emsworth and the villages of North Oakley, Deane, Dummer, Brown Candover, Abbotstone, Cheriton, Hinton Ampner, Kilmeston, Soberton, and Denmead.

By the path is a memorial to the first flight of Geoffrey de Havilland. The footpath also passes close to Watership Down, Hampshire.

The footpath is waymarked by metal and plastic disks found attached to wooden and metal posts, trees and street furniture, and where this isn't possible stickers on lampposts etc.  It has also spawned several circular routes that use sections of the main footpath.  These are also waymarked.

This route is shown as a series of green diamonds on Ordnance Survey 1:25,000 maps and as a series of red diamonds on Ordnance Survey 1:50,000 maps.

Walbury Hill is also the start of the Test Way and is the start of the Combe Gibbet to Overton 16 Mile Trail Race, the first 11 miles of its route being on Wayfarer's Walk.

Places of interest
The following places of interest, hillfort sites and hills can be found along the length of the Walk (listed from southeast to northwest):
 Fort Purbrook
 The source of the River Itchen
 Tidley Hill
 Watership Down
 Ladle Hill and Iron Age hillfort and SSSI
 Pilot Hill and Dean Hill
 Walbury Hill and the Iron Age hillfort of Walbury Camp
 The start of the Test Way

Map
These maps show the footpath in relation to nearby major roads.  Maps are not on the same scale.

See also
 Long-distance footpaths in the UK
 North Wessex Downs Area of Outstanding Natural Beauty

External links

 Hampshire County Council information on the Wayfarer's Walk
 Wayfarer's Walk (Walking on the Web)
 Wayfarer's Walk (Long Distance Walkers’ Association)
 Overton Harriers & AC (Combe Gibbet to Overton 16 Route)

Footpaths in Hampshire
Footpaths in Berkshire
Long-distance footpaths in England